The Venice Beach Boardwalk is a two-mile promenade stretching parallel to Venice Beach. In the North, the Boardwalk connects to the Santa Monica Boardwalk, and terminates in Marina del Rey in the South. Notable attractions along the Venice Beach boardwalk include Muscle Beach, the Venice Beach Skatepark, the Venice Art Walls, as well as numerous volleyball courts. The Venice Beach Boardwalk attracts approximately 28,000 to 30,000 tourists daily.

References

Venice, Los Angeles